Davidson's Mains railway station served the district of Davidson's Mains, Edinburgh, Scotland from 1894 to 1951 on the Barnton Branch.

History 

The station opened as Barnton Gate on 1 March 1894 by the Caledonian Railway. The station's name was changed to Davidson's Mains on 1 April 1903. To the southeast was Davidson's Mains Goods Yard. It was located next to Barnton House instead of Davidson's Mains, which was to the southeast. The station closed on 7 May 1951 along with the line. The site is now housing.

References

External links 

Disused railway stations in Edinburgh
Railway stations in Great Britain opened in 1894
Railway stations in Great Britain closed in 1951
Former Caledonian Railway stations
1894 establishments in Scotland
1951 disestablishments in Scotland